Hilton Branch is a stream in Shelby County in the U.S. state of Missouri. It is a tributary of Black Creek.

Hilton Branch has the name of A. J. Hilton, an early settler.

See also
List of rivers of Missouri

References

Rivers of Shelby County, Missouri
Rivers of Missouri